The 1961–62 season was the 82nd season of competitive Football in England.

Overview
The season was notable for the remarkable achievement of Ipswich Town winning the League Championship. Under the managership of Alf Ramsey, the club progressed from the old Third Division South to the First Division.  Ipswich were dismissed by most of the media at the time as relegation candidates, but Ramsey's tactics baffled the big clubs in the division such as favourites Tottenham Hotspur and Burnley, and other big names such as Manchester United and Arsenal.  Before Ramsey's tenure Ipswich had no tradition to speak of, and indeed had never even played in the top flight of English Football.  Ramsey's triumph led him to being offered the job of the England football team manager, which he duly accepted in 1963; England won the World Cup three years later. Liverpool were promoted from the Second Division after eight years.  Manager Bill Shankly would soon take the club to unparalleled heights in the years to come.  Accrington Stanley resigned from the league because of financial difficulties on 11 March 1962.  As a consequence, all their previous results for the season in the Fourth Division were expunged from the records.  They were replaced in 1962–63 by Oxford United.

Diary of the season

22 August 1961: Rotherham United beat Aston Villa 2–0 in the first leg of the first ever Football League Cup final. Fixture congestion has meant that last season's competition has stretched into this season.

11 September 1961: The floodlights at the City Ground are officially turned on for the first time as Nottingham Forest face Gillingham in the League Cup.

11 October 1961: Reports surface indicating Welsh internationalist John Charles of Juventus will soon be back in English football after joining the Bianconeri in 1957: the Italian club's vice-president told the press "[Charles] had already told me of his wish to return to England to look after his children's education".

18 November 1961: Table-topping Burnley drop their first points of the season by drawing 3–3 with Wolverhampton Wanderers. Elsewhere in the top-flight, Ipswich Town rack up a fifth win in a row by beating Manchester United 4–1, Tottenham Hotspur play out a goalless draw at Sheffield Wednesday, Birmingham City put four without reply past West Ham United, who slump into fifth, below both Ipswich and Spurs. In the rest of the Football League, Liverpool are seven points clear of Scunthorpe United at the top of the Second Division, South Coast clubs Bournemouth & Boscombe Athletic and Portsmouth lead Division Three, and Welsh club Wrexham, who have recorded 14 wins already this season, are top of the Fourth Division.

23 April 1962: Ipswich beat Arsenal 3–0 and Burnley are held by Blackburn Rovers in the East Lancashire derby, giving Town a two-point lead over Burnley at the top of Division One. In the race to evade joining already-relegated Chelsea in next season's second-tier, Cardiff City pick up a useful win against West Ham United, while fellow strugglers Fulham were beaten by West Bromwich Albion. Both Cardiff and Fulham are on 31 points, but the West Londoners have one game more left to play compared with the Bluebirds. In the Second Division, Leyton Orient's win over Luton Town ensures the East London club continue to chase Scunthorpe and Sunderland for the last remaining promotion spot.

28 April 1962: Ipswich, in the First Division for the first time, are crowned champions of English club football with a 2–0 win at home Aston Villa on the last day of the league season. It is the first major trophy of their history, and the first time that an English club has won the title in their first season as a top division club.

5 May 1962: Tottenham Hotspur retain the FA Cup with a 3–1 win over Burnley at Wembley Stadium with goals from Jimmy Greaves, Bobby Smith and Danny Blanchflower.

July 1962: Manchester United pay a British record fee of £115,000 for Scottish striker Denis Law from Torino of Italy.

Awards
Football Writers' Association
 Footballer of the Year – Jimmy Adamson (Burnley)
Top goalscorer
 Ray Crawford (Ipswich Town) and Derek Kevan (West Bromwich Albion), 33

Honours

Football League

First Division
Ipswich Town achieved a superb debut in the First Division as champions, finishing three points ahead of runners-up Burnley. Third placed Tottenham Hotspur were unable to retain their league title but at least managed to retain the FA Cup, while Everton and Sheffield United completed the top five. 

Manchester United endured their worst postwar finish by finishing 15th despite the expensive signing of forward David Herd before the start of the season, which prompted Matt Busby to strengthen United's attack by bringing Denis Law back to England from Italy in British football's first six-figure transfer. 

Chelsea, who had gradually lost touch with the First Division's leading pack since their 1955 title triumph, went down in bottom place, and were joined by Cardiff City in relegation.

Second Division
Liverpool finally secured a First Division comeback as champions of the Second Division, with forward Roger Hunt being instrumental with 41 league goals. They were joined in promotion by a Leyton Orient side who had never appeared in the top flight before. Sunderland missed out on promotion by a single point, while Scunthorpe United (with just over a decade of league football behind them) emerged as surprise promotion contenders before having to settle for a fourth-place finish – still their best finish yet. 

Norwich City had a disappointing season in the league after last season's promotion push, but compensated for this by winning the Football League Cup – the first major trophy of their history.

Brighton and Bristol Rovers went down.

Third Division
Portsmouth achieved an instant return to the Second Division as champions of the Third Division. They were joined in promotion by Grimsby Town.

Newport County, Brentford, Lincoln City and Torquay United went down to the Fourth Division.

Fourth Division
Millwall clinched the Fourth Division title, and were joined in promotion by Colchester United, Wrexham and Carlisle United.

Accrington Stanley were forced to resign from the season several weeks before the end of the Fourth Division campaign, and their place in the Fourth Division went to Football League newcomers Oxford United.

Top goalscorers

First Division
Ray Crawford (Ipswich Town) and Derek Kevan (West Bromwich Albion) – 33 goals

Second Division
Roger Hunt (Liverpool) – 41 goals

Third Division
Cliff Holton (Watford and Northampton Town) – 37 goals

Fourth Division
Bobby Hunt (Colchester United) – 37 goals

References